Racovița may refer to several places in Romania:

 Racovița, Brăila, a commune in Brăila County
 Racovița, Sibiu, a commune in Sibiu County
 Racovița, Timiș, a commune in Timiș County
 Racovița, Vâlcea, a commune in Vâlcea County
 Racovița, a village in Bucșani Commune, Dâmbovița County
 Racovița, a village in Braloștița Commune, Dolj County
 Racovița, a village in Polovragi Commune, Gorj County
 Racovița, a village in Voineasa Commune, Olt County
 Racovița, a village in Gârceni Commune, Vaslui County
 Racovița, a village in Budești Commune, Vâlcea County
 Racovița, a district in the town of Mioveni, Argeș County
 Racovița, a tributary of the Avrig in Sibiu County
 Racovița (Făgăraș), a tributary of the Olt in Brașov County
 Racovița (Ialomița), a tributary of the Ialomița in Dâmbovița County
 Racovița, a tributary of the Olt in Sibiu County

See also 
 Racoviță
 Racova (disambiguation)